Lessons in Forgetting  is a 2012 Indian film produced by Prince Thampi for Arowana Studios. It is based on the novel of the same name by Anita Nair and directed by Unni Vijayan. It stars Adil Hussain, Roshni Achreja, Maya Tideman and Raaghav Chanana. The film is shot in 35mm Cinemascope.

It was awarded the 2012 National Film Award for Best Feature Film in English.

Plot

A renowned expert on cyclones J.A. Krishnamoorthy comes to India, when he learns that his daughter, Smriti, has met with a fatal freak accident. Determined to find out the truth behind his daughter’s accident, JAK starts to retrace his daughter’s path on the days that led to her accident in a small town in Tamil Nadu.

With a strong desire to know the truth, JAK embarks on his own investigation. He meets with the people who were close to Smriti. They give different versions of what they felt about her. JAK feels he is getting closer to the truth. But his hopes are shattered when he reaches a dead end.

Meera, a socialite, finds her life in chaos when her husband walks out on her leaving her with her two children, mother and her grandmother. Left to fend for herself, Meera takes up a job as an assistant to JAK. Inadvertently she leads him to a very important piece of the puzzle of the case.

Various events and coincidences, help him in getting closer to the truth. They find themselves back in Minjikapuram, the coastal town where it all began. Here JAK realises that, there was a bigger issue that Smriti was fighting against.

JAK must show the courage to confront the reality and forget the past.

Cast

 Adil Hussain as JAK
 Roshni Achreja as Meera
 Maya Tideman as Smriti
 Raaghav Chanana as Soman
 Karan Nair as Mathew
 Amey Wagh as Shivu
 Bhanu Prakash as Dr.Srinivasan
 Srilekha as Chinnataayi
 Anuja Vaidya as Nayantara
 Veena Sajnani as Meera's Mother
 Lakshmi Krishnamurthy as Meera's Grandmother
 Parthiv Shah as Nikhil
 Sukitha Aiyar as Vinnie
 Uttara Baokar as Kalachitti.
 Sanjeev Murali as Theatre group leader.

Production
Produced by Prince Thampi for Arowana Studios, the movie is based on the bestselling novel by the same title, written by Anita Nair. Prince Thampi is best known as the publisher of the Malayalam magazine Santham. Lessons in Forgetting is the first film to be produced  by Arowana Studios. Some of the staff members of Arowana Studios and the Parent Company Arowana Consulting Limited also participated as extras in a few scenes.

Filming locations

Shot entirely in India across
-Bangalore (Karnataka, India).
-Pondicherry (Tamil Nadu, India).
-Mahabalipuram (Tamil Nadu, India).
-Coonoor/ Mettupalayam (Tamil Nadu, India).

Crew

Awards

 Unni Vijayan, Director - Outstanding Achievement In International Feature Filmmaking - Williamsburg International Film Festival, New York (2012)
 Adil Hussain : Best Actor - New Jersey Independent South Asian Cine Fest, New Jersey.(2012)
 Roshni Achreja : Best Supporting Actress - New Jersey Independent South Asian Cine Fest, New Jersey.(2012)
 Roshan N. G., Best Makeup Artist - Sunset International Film Festival, Los Angeles. (2012)
 60th National Film Award for Best Feature Film in English

Screenings

 Rome International Film Festival 2012 (RIFF)
 Chicago South Asian Film Festival 2012 (CSAFF)
 Williamsburg International Film Festival, New York
 New Jersey Independent South Asian Cine Fest, New Jersey (2012)
 Sunset International Film Festival, Los Angeles (2012)

References

 
 
 
 
 
 
 
 
 
 
 
 
 
 
 
 
 
 
 
 

 
 
 https://web.archive.org/web/20110811045719/http://www.businessworld.in/bw/2010_02_09_Women_And_Womanhood.html
 
 http://timesofindia.indiatimes.com/topic/article/06lpfK8gUq4m7?q=Adil+Hussain
 https://web.archive.org/web/20110320045821/http://www.newkerala.com/news/world/fullnews-170168.html

External links

2012 films
English-language Indian films
Films based on Indian novels
Films set in Tamil Nadu
Films shot in Ooty
Films shot in Bangalore
Films shot in Puducherry
Films shot in Tamil Nadu
Best English Feature Film National Film Award winners
2010s English-language films